The Jahangirpuri  Metro Station is located on the Yellow Line of the Delhi Metro.

Station layout

Track layout

Entry/exit

Connections

Delhi Transport Corporation bus routes number 17, 19, 19A, 19B, 100, 100A, 100EXT, 101A, 101B, 101EXT, 103, 103EXT, 103STL, 106, 106A, 107, 109, 112, 113, 113EXT, 116, 119, 120, 120A, 120B, 123, 124, 125, 128, 129, 130, 131, 134, 135, 136, 137, 138, 140, 142, 142A, 144, 146, 147, 148, 149, 154, 159, 169, 169SPL, 171, 172, 173, 175, 177, 179, 181, 181A, 191, 193, 194, 195, 199, 259, 333, 341, 804, 804A, 861, 883, 982, 982LSTL, GMS(+)(-) serves the station.

See also

List of Delhi Metro stations
Transport in Delhi
Delhi Metro Rail Corporation
Delhi Suburban Railway
Delhi Transport Corporation
North Delhi
National Capital Region (India)
List of rapid transit systems
List of metro systems

References

External links

 Delhi Metro Rail Corporation Ltd. (Official site) 
 Delhi Metro Annual Reports
 
 UrbanRail.Net – descriptions of all metro systems in the world, each with a schematic map showing all stations.

Delhi Metro stations
Railway stations opened in 2009
Railway stations in North West Delhi district
2009 establishments in Delhi